Felix G. Arroyo (born May 25, 1979) is an American political figure from Boston. Arroyo was elected to an at-large seat on the Boston City Council in November 2009, and re-elected in November 2011, serving for two terms before unsuccessfully running for Mayor of Boston in 2013. He subsequently served as the city's Chief of Health and Human Services from 2014 until his dismissal in 2017 following an investigation into sexual harassment allegations.

Early life
Arroyo is the son of former Boston City Councilor Felix D. Arroyo. He attended Boston public schools and is a graduate of University of Massachusetts Boston. He also earned a master's degree from Southern New Hampshire University. Prior to being elected to the Boston City Council, Arroyo served as a field director at Northeast Action and Political Director for the Service Employees International Union Local 615.

Political career

Boston City Council
Arroyo was an at-large member of the Boston City Council from January 2010 to January 2014. During his time on the City Council, he developed legislation called "Invest in Boston" to invest Boston's money in banks that invest in Boston to help promote economic development. He led the effort on the council to save thousands of youth summer jobs and prevent the closures of libraries. He did not seek re-election to the council, due to seeking election as mayor.

Mayoral run
In April 2013, Arroyo announced his candidacy for the Boston mayoral election. He officially kicked off his campaign on June 15, at Villa Victoria.  Arroyo lost in the September preliminary election, having received 9,888 votes and finishing fifth in a field of 12, where the top two vote-getters advance to the November general election.

After being eliminated, he endorsed Marty Walsh in the general election.

Chief of Health and Human Services
In January 2014, Mayor Marty Walsh named Arroyo as the Chief of Health and Human Services for Boston. Arroyo was the first Cabinet-level position announced by the newly elected mayor.  Walsh cited Arroyo's ability to bring people together and work collaboratively, as well as his understanding of the importance of addressing the needs of Boston's most vulnerable population.

Sexual harassment investigation and dismissal
On July 28, 2017, Arroyo was placed on paid administrative leave from his position at the Boston Department of Health. Although this was confirmed by Mayor Walsh, no further details were made available. On August 24, 2017, a spokesperson for Mayor Walsh announced that Arroyo had been fired after a "comprehensive investigation" into sexual harassment allegations. Arroyo's accuser initially filed a complaint with the Massachusetts Commission Against Discrimination (MCAD); that complaint was withdrawn in November 2017, in lieu of a civil suit against Arroyo and the City of Boston filed in March 2018. , the case was still active and had not yet gone to trial. In August 2020, Arroyo filed suit against the City of Boston and Mayor Walsh alleging breach of contract, negligence, and defamation.

Personal life
Arroyo is a lifelong Bostonian, born in the South End, raised in Hyde Park, and a graduate of the Boston Public Schools. He lives in the Jamaica Plain neighborhood of Boston. In addition to his father having previously served on the Boston City Council, his brother Ricardo Arroyo took office in January 2020 representing District 5. , Arroyo's LinkedIn profile lists his occupation as Chief Operating Officer at El Mundo Boston, a Latino media outlet.

Electoral history

City Council

Mayor

References

Further reading

External links
 Arroyo's mayoral campaign website from April 2013 via Wayback Machine

Boston City Council members
Living people
Hispanic and Latino American city council members
University of Massachusetts Boston alumni
Southern New Hampshire University alumni
1979 births
Service Employees International Union people
American politicians of Puerto Rican descent
Massachusetts Democrats
People from South End, Boston
People from Jamaica Plain
People from Hyde Park, Boston